This article displays the rosters for the teams competing at the EuroBasket Women 2011. Each teams had to submit 12 players.

Group A



The roster was announced on June 16.





Group B





The roster was announced on June 14.



Group C





The roster was announced on June 16.

The roster was announced on June 16.

Group D









References

External links
 FIBA Archive

Squads
EuroBasket Women squads